Francisco de Figueroa may refer to:

Francisco de Figueroa (bishop) (1634–1691), Spanish Roman Catholic bishop
Francisco de Figueroa (poet) (1530–1588), Spanish poet
Francisco Acuña de Figueroa (1791–1862), Uruguayan poet and writer